The County Court of England and Wales dates back to the County Courts Act 1846, which received royal assent on 28 August 1846 and was brought into force on 15 March 1847.

England and Wales (with the exception of the City of London, which was outside the scope of the Act) were divided into 60 circuits, with a total of 491 county courts within these circuits. The then Lord Chancellor, Lord Cottenham, wanted everyone to be within seven miles of a court, and the final scheme came close to that aim. One county court judge was appointed to each circuit, assisted by one or more registrars with some limited judicial powers, and would travel between the courts in his area as necessary, sitting in each court at least once a month. Few permanent courts were needed initially, given the infrequency of court hearings, and temporary accommodation such as a town hall would often be used where there was no existing courthouse for use. In some places, a building is now shared with the Crown Court (as at Maidstone Combined Court Centre, for example), the Family Court, or a magistrates' court. The judicial business of the County Court is now carried out by circuit judges (a term introduced by the Courts Act 1971) and district judges (as the post of registrar was renamed by section 74 of the Courts and Legal Services Act 1990). Part-time judges (recorders, deputy district judges and some retired judges) also sit in the county court.  As at 1 April 2015, there are 640 circuit judges and 441 district judges.

The system of 60 circuits was abolished in 1970. Over time, whilst new courts have been opened in various locations, there has been an overall reduction in the number of locations where a county court is held.  In June 2010, the Ministry of Justice announced plans to close 54 county courts and 103 magistrates' courts, in order to save £15m in annual running costs and £22m in necessary maintenance. After consultation, it was decided to keep five of these county courts open: Barnsley, Bury, Llangefni, the Mayor's and City of London Court, and Skipton. From 22 April 2014, the Crime and Courts Act 2013 replaced the previous system of county courts for different localities with one County Court that operates throughout England and Wales, sitting in multiple locations simultaneously.  In July 2015, further proposals to close nineteen County Court venues were announced.

All name changes before 1 August 1983 reflect changes in the locations where the court sat. Before then, a county court with more than one location in its title would sit at each location named. The obligation for one court to sit in multiple locations was removed by the Civil Courts Order 1983. Instead, it was specified that a county court was to be held at each location named in the order and courts were to be named after that one location (save for a few exceptions where the name of a former court town was retained in the court's title, such as the Aldershot and Farnham County Court).

On 22 April 2014 the various county courts were merged into one single County Court for England and Wales, and since then the venues have been referred as, for example, "the County Court at Exeter" instead of "Exeter County Court" as previously.

Venues

Until 1 January 1937, when the County Court Districts (Name of Court) Order 1936 came into force, the full title of each court was The County Court of (county) holden at (location/locations), using the historic county names for England and for Wales. Thereafter, each court was renamed as (location/s) County Court.  For brevity, the latter form is used throughout in this table, and "County Court" is abbreviated to "CC".

See also
Courts of England and Wales
List of courts in England and Wales
List of former county courts in Wales

References
General
Polden, Patrick (1999). A History of the County Court, 1846–1971. Cambridge University Press. .
For the courts that opened on 15 March 1847: the Order in Council of 9 March 1847 bringing the 1846 Act into force on 15 March 1847 and establishing the original 491 county courts was published in a supplement to the London Gazette on 10 March 1847.
For all courts: the HMCTS CourtFinder gives details of every court, including details of which share premises with crown courts or magistrates' courts.
Specific
Save where references are given to publication in the London Gazette, the Statutory Instruments listed below were published by Her Majesty's Stationery Office and the date that the Order was made is given. Statutory Instruments from 1987 onwards are available online.

England and Wales, County
 List
County Courts
1847 establishments in England
1847 establishments in Wales
Wales law-related lists
England law-related lists
Lists of buildings and structures in Wales
Lists of buildings and structures in England